Valle de Guadalupe is a village in Querétaro, Mexico. It is located in the municipality of Landa de Matamoros. It has 834 inhabitants, and is located at 1620 meters above sea level.

References

Populated places in Querétaro